Citizens (ordinary passport holders) of specific countries and territories are eligible to visit Bolivia for tourism or business purposes without having to obtain a visa.

There are 3 groups of countries, countries whose citizens do not require a visa (Group 1), countries whose citizens must obtain a visa prior to entry for free, or upon arrival for a fee (Group 2), and countries whose citizens must obtain visa in advance with special authorization (Group 3).


Visa policy map

Visa exemption
Citizens or nationals of the following 53 countries and territories may enter Bolivia without a visa for up to the duration listed below:

1 - including all classes of British nationality.
ID - May enter with an ID card in lieu of a passport.

Holders of diplomatic or service passports of any country do not require a visa. Visa exemption also applies to holders of passports for public affairs issued by China.

Group 2 Countries
National of countries in Group 2 must obtain a visa prior to arrival, obtained at any Bolivian embassy or consulate free of charge, or on arrival.

Nationals of  can obtain a visa on arrival for 30 days only at Cochabamba, La Paz and Santa Cruz airports. The fee of US$30 is also applicable even if the visa is obtained in advance at a Bolivian embassy or consulate.

The fee of US$30 also applies when the visa is obtained in advance. China is lifted to Group 2 Country effective on Aug 17, 2014. Chinese nationals can get visa on arrival at airport or land check points as indicated by Bolivian Embassy in Beijing on Dec 27, 2017.

Nationals of  can obtain a visa on arrival for 90 days. The fee of US$30 also applies when the visa is obtained in advance.

Group 3 Countries
Nationals of the following countries cannot obtain a visa on arrival and are required to obtain further authorization from a Bolivian embassy or consulate:

Visitor statistics
Most visitors arriving to Bolivia were from the following countries of nationality:

See also

Visa requirements for Bolivian citizens
Tourism in Bolivia

References

External links
Bolivian General Directorate of Migration 
Visa policy of Bolivia 

Bolivia
Foreign relations of Bolivia